The 1952 North Carolina lieutenant gubernatorial election was held on November 4, 1952. Democratic nominee Luther H. Hodges defeated Republican nominee Warren H. Pritchard with 67.67% of the vote.

Primary elections
Primary elections were held on May 31, 1952.

Democratic primary

Candidates
Luther H. Hodges, former member of the North Carolina Highway and Public Works Commission
Roy H. Rowe, State Senator
Benjamin J. McDonald
Marshall C. Kurfees, Mayor of Winston-Salem

Results

Republican primary

Candidates
Warren H. Pritchard
William G. Lehew

Results

General election

Candidates
Luther H. Hodges, Democratic
Warren H. Pritchard, Republican

Results

References

1952
Gubernatorial
North Carolina